, also known by his Chinese-style name , was a bureaucrat of the Ryukyu Kingdom.

Ikegusuku Ankon was the eleventh head of an aristocrat family called Mō-uji Ikegusuku Dunchi.

He was sent to China together with Tei Kokutei to request for King Shō Kō's investiture in 1804. Later, he served as a member of sanshikan from 1823 to 1829.

References

1768 births
Ueekata
Sanshikan
People of the Ryukyu Kingdom
Ryukyuan people
18th-century Ryukyuan people
Year of death unknown